Beulah is an unincorporated community in Crawford County, Kansas, United States.

History
Beulah was founded in 1874 by a colony of Methodists. The Methodist church was completed in 1881.  A post office was opened in Beulah on December 31, 1874, and remained in operation until it was discontinued on March 15, 1955.

Beulah was a station on the St. Louis–San Francisco Railway.

Notable people
College football coach and innovator Homer Woodson Hargiss went to Beulah High School before it closed.

References

Further reading

External links
 Crawford County maps: Current, Historic, KDOT

Unincorporated communities in Crawford County, Kansas
Unincorporated communities in Kansas